Matthew Wayne Darwin (born March 11, 1963) is a former American football center in the National Football League (NFL) for the Philadelphia Eagles. He was drafted twice, first in the 1985 NFL Draft by the Dallas Cowboys and finally in the 1986 NFL Draft by the Eagles. He played college football at Texas A&M University.

Early years
Darwin attended Klein High School, where he played as a tight end. He accepted a football scholarship from Texas A&M University. 

As a freshman, he was converted into an offensive tackle and became a starter. As a sophomore, he was named the starting center. As a senior, he played at center and guard, while not allowing an opponent sack.

Professional career

Dallas Cowboys
Darwin was selected by the Dallas Cowboys in the fifth round (119th overall) of the 1985 NFL Draft. He had a contentious negotiation with the team and didn't reach a contract agreement during the season.

Philadelphia Eagles
After not signing with any team during the 1985 season, he re-entered the NFL Draft and was selected by the Philadelphia Eagles in the fourth round (106th overall) of the 1986 NFL Draft.

After experiencing another contract holdout, he replaced an injured Gerry Feehery and started 10 games at center as a rookie. The next year, he was moved to left tackle, where he would remain as the starter for three years.

On December 21, 1989 he was placed on the injured reserve list with a left knee injury. The next year he re-injured his knee and was placed on the injured reserve list on September 30 after playing and starting in two games.

Personal life
After his football career, Darwin settled down and became a scoutmaster for Troop 437 in Richardson, Texas until 2018, when he stepped down after his third youngest son became an Eagle Scout, graduated, went to college, and was married.
Matt Darwin currently attends Cornerstone Baptist Church in Wylie, Texas.
He married and had many children, which all but one are now graduated and are very tall.

References

External links
The Last Holdout Darwin Agonizes But Does Not Waver
Matt Darwin Takes The Field On A Rebuilt Left Knee

1963 births
Living people
Players of American football from Houston
American football centers
American football offensive tackles
Texas A&M Aggies football players
Philadelphia Eagles players